The 1917 Massachusetts Aggies football team was to represent Massachusetts Agricultural College in the 1917 college football season. Mass Aggie did not field an official varsity football team during this season as most able-bodied men of college age were serving in the U.S. Armed Forces during World War I.

References

Massachusetts
UMass Minutemen football seasons
Massachusetts Aggies football